The Bridgeport Lamp Chimney Company Bowstring Concrete Arch Bridge is located between Mechanic Street and Baltimore and Ohio Railroad tracks in Bridgeport, West Virginia. The bridge was constructed in 1924, designed by Frank McEnteer. This elegant bowstring reinforced concrete arch bridge represents a traditional bridge type which was readily adapted to what was essentially a new construction material: reinforced concrete. Unlike a rail or road bridge, this bridge can be considered an unusual pedestrian bridge in that it was built by the Bridgeport Lamp Chimney Company in 1924 to provide access from the glass plant to a warehouse on the other side of Simpson Creek. The bridge was designed to carry hand carts with glass products across the river to the warehouse. The bridge remains the only evidence of the original works, and its successor, Master Glass Company. Thus the bridge stands in splendid isolation from any other structure.

Structure details
Although hidden from view, a notable feature is the proprietary reinforcement used throughout the structure. The principal reinforcing bars are either of the patented Havemeyer reinforcement produced by the Concrete Steel Company of New York, or a similar bar produced by Cambria Iron Works of Johnstown, Pennsylvania. It was an era of intense competition among reinforcing bar manufacturers with each individual deformed bar pattern carefully protected by patents. Smooth bars of approximately  diameter were employed for stirrups throughout the bridge structure.

Arch: 
Tension ties: 
Deck: 
Verticals:

Historical significance
The reinforced concrete bowstring arch erected in 1924 by Frank Duff McEnteer and his Concrete Steel Bridge Company is an elegant expression of the bridge builders art executed by one of the pioneers in the use of reinforced concrete for both bridges and buildings. The bridge is a poignant reminder of the early glass industry that flourished in the Clarksburg area and indeed in the state as a whole. The glass industry found a favorable business climate based on cheap natural gas and abundant quartzite for producing products ranging from utilitarian bottles to the finest cut glass. Little remains of this once flourishing industry.

See also
List of bridges documented by the Historic American Engineering Record in West Virginia

References

External links

Bridges on the National Register of Historic Places in West Virginia
Buildings and structures in Harrison County, West Virginia
Tied arch bridges in the United States
Bridges completed in 1924
Transportation in Harrison County, West Virginia
Pedestrian bridges in West Virginia
National Register of Historic Places in Harrison County, West Virginia
Historic American Engineering Record in West Virginia
1924 establishments in West Virginia
Pedestrian bridges on the National Register of Historic Places
Bridgeport, West Virginia
Concrete bridges in the United States